Bill Lowery (October 21, 1924 – June 8, 2004) was an American music entrepreneur.

Early successes
Lowery was born in Leesville, Louisiana. He studied radio dramatics at Taft Junior College and went on to a number of radio-announcing jobs.  At age 21 he was hired to direct the construction and programming of WBEJ, a radio station in Elizabethton, Tennessee.

In the early 1950s, Lowery was the top country music disc jockey in America and also was a pioneer TV host on Atlanta television. A 1951 diagnosis of cancer (which he ultimately survived) left Lowery wondering how to provide for his family, and he decided to go into the music publishing business. Although the music industry told Lowery that no music company could be based anywhere but New York, Chicago, Nashville, or Los Angeles, he believed that Atlanta could be a true music city. Together with an associate, Dennis "Boots" Woodall, Lowery formed Lowery Music Company and was involved in independent record production and promotion. Early hit songs published by Lowery Music included a string of country music hits for major labels, but two of the most notable Lowery Music songs were early rockabilly hits: "Be Bop A Lula" by Gene Vincent & His Blue Caps, and "Young Love", recorded by both Sonny James and movie actor Tab Hunter. Lowery is credited with being involved in the earliest recordings of Ray Stevens and Jerry Reed for Capitol Records.

NRC days
In 1958, Lowery formed National Recording Corporation in Atlanta. To raise capital, sales of "founders' contracts" were made by a group headed by Ray Griggers. NRC initially recorded at WGST Radio studios until stock sales allowed NRC to set up its record pressing plant, record distributorship, and recording studio, with Ray Stevens, Joe South, and Jerry Reed as the staff band.  Despite early hit records such as "Robbin' The Cradle" by Tony Bellus, as well as manufacturing and distribution of other labels, NRC was forced into bankruptcy in April 1961. Lowery called NRC "his only failure".

Later years
Lowery continued in music publishing, along with studio ownership and artist management of a list of successful artists. Before his death, Lowery Music was sold to Sony/ATV Music Publishing. His work with the Friends of Georgia Music organization assured that Georgia-based artists would be honored in the Georgia Music Hall of Fame. Artists with whom Lowery was connected include (but are not limited to): Joe South, Jerry Reed, Robert Ray Whitley, Ray Stevens, Mac Davis, Tommy Roe, Atlanta Rhythm Section, Alicia Bridges, Dennis Yost & Classics IV, Backalley Bandits, Bertie Higgins, and Billy Joe Royal. Noted session and touring drummer Michael Huey began his career with the Lowery Organization as a staff musician, as did A-Team sessions guitarist and producer Chip Young.

Lowery died in Atlanta, Georgia, on June 8, 2004, after a four-month battle with cancer.

References

External links

Businesspeople from Atlanta
American radio DJs
1924 births
2004 deaths
Record producers from Louisiana
20th-century American musicians
People from Leesville, Louisiana
20th-century American businesspeople